Russell Brand: Re:Birth is a 2018 standup comedy film written and performed by English comedian and activist Russell Brand. It debuted on Netflix on 4 December 2018.

Re:Birth was filmed at the Hackney Empire theatre in East London in April 2018 during his 2017–18 comedy tour of the same name.

References

External links 
 

2018 films
Stand-up comedy concert films
Netflix specials
Films shot in London
British comedy films
2018 comedy films
Russell Brand
2010s English-language films
2010s British films